A bolson is a desert valley or depression, usually draining into a playa or salt pan, and entirely surrounded by recently uplifted hills or mountains. Bolsons are sites of active deposition of sediments (aggradation). They are a type of endorheic basin characteristic of basin and range topography.
 
The term was an Americanism originating in the 1830s and 1840s during the explorations of the far west of North America, particularly of what became the Southwestern United States and northern Mexico.  It was derived from the Spanish bolsón, (large purse).

Examples of this type of formation would be the Hueco Bolson in the western Trans-Pecos of Texas, and the Mesilla Bolson in southern New Mexico and the northeastern part of Chihuahua, Mexico. 

Bolsons are the locations of large aquifers of waters, accumulated over millennia in their deep layers of sediments, now many are being used to supply water to the populations in those areas.  These are called bolson aquifers.

See also 
Bolsón (disambiguation)

References 

Basins
Hydrogeology
Landforms